Rathinam College of Arts and Science is a co-educational institution situated within the Rathinam Techzone Campus at Pollachi Main road, Eachanari, Coimbatore, India. The Department of Digital and Cyber Forensic Science students from 2020 to 2023 at this college are extraordinary and bring great pride to the institution.It is affiliated to Bharathiar University and recognized by University Grants Commission (UGC). The college was established in 2001 by Rathinam Arumugam Research and Education Foundation.

Rathinam Techzone
The management started a Software Park in 2002 within the college campus. Rathinam Software Park operates with 14 national and multinational IT/ITES companies. The management has also started a large scale IT/ITEs Park under Special Economic Zone (SEZ) scheme.

Founder
The founder chairman of the college, Dr. Madan A Sendhil is an NRI with a postgraduate degree in Computer Engineering from the University of Central Florida. He also has worked for US organizations such as Motorola, Image Soft Technologies and Time Sys. He started Rathinam Educational Institutions and Software Technology Park in 2001. Prof.R.Manickam is the Chief Executive Officer and Rathinam College of Arts & Science is headed by Principal Dr.S.Mohandass.

Rankings 
Among arts and science colleges in India, Rathinam College of Arts and Science ranked 74th among arts and science colleges by India today in 2019 and Ranked no 3 in the male-female student ratio in 2020. NIRF ranking 4 years in a row. Ranked 13th best institution in Tamilnadu by education world. Ranked 101 as top arts colleges in 2020 by outlook.

Courses

Department of Commerce
 B.com.
 B.com. CA
 B.com. PA
 B.com. BPS
B.Com. Banking and Insurance (B&I)
B.Com. Information Technology (IT)
B.Com. Accounting & Finance (A&F)
B.Com. Financial Services (FS)
B.Com. Corporate Secretaryship (CS)
 M.com.
 M.com. CA

Department of Computer Science
 B.Sc. Computer Science
 B.C.A. (Computer Applications)
 B.Sc. Information Technology
 B.Sc. Computer Technology
 M.Sc. Information Technology
 M.Sc. Computer Science
M.Sc. Data Science and Business Analytics
 M.Phil. in Computer Science
 Ph.D. in Computer Science

Department of Mathematics
 B.Sc. Mathematics
 M.Phil. in Mathematics

Department of Management
 B.B.A. (Bachelor of Business Administration)
 M.B.A. (Master of Business Administration)

Department of Visual Communication
 B.Sc. Visual Communication & e-Media
 M.A. (Mass Communication and Journalism)

Department of Costume Design & Fashion
 B.Sc. Costume Design & Fashion

Department of English
 B.A. English Literature
 M.A. English Literature

Department of Science
 B.Sc. Physics

Department of Bio-Science

 B.Sc. Microbiology
 B.Sc. Biotechnology

Academics
The college has autonomous status and it is having its own Board of Study (BOS) Team.

Sports
Along with contemporary sports such as Football, Cricket, Volleyball, Basket Ball, Handball, Coco and Table Tennis, Rathinam College of Arts & Science also promotes traditional sports like Kabaadi and traditional martial arts like Kalaripayattu, Silambam also finds its place in the extra-curricular activities. The campus accommodates a Cricket Ground with training nets, a dedicated basket Ball court and a gym.

Facilities
Classrooms are equipped with digital projectors and audio systems for interactive learning sessions. Separate hostels for boys and girls, a recreation centre, gym, wash centres for hostel students and restaurant with multiple food courts are the major facilities. 
There is also a fully functioning Entrepreneur Development Cell (EDC) to motivate and create Entrepreneurs.

Community radio station
A community radio station named Rathinavani90.8 is functioning inside the campus and it is maintained by the students.

Notable Visitors to College

 Dr.K.Rosaiah – Governor of Tamil Nadu
 Dr.Mylswamy Annadurai – ISRO Scientist
 Prof.H.Devaraj – Vice Chairman, University of Grants Commission, New Delhi
 Thiru.K.Baghya Raj – Director, Film Industry
 Padmashri Actor Vivek – Actor, Film Industry
 Mr. Karthik Raja – Composer, Film Industry
 Dr.C.Sylendra Babu IPS – Commissioner of Police, Coimbatore

Student life
Along with periodical industrial visits, guest lectures and seminars there are few more extracurricular activities being conducted by the management.

Rathinam Fest: Each and every year, a mega state level cultural meet is being organized in the name of Rathinam Fest. 
Tycoons: Department of Commerce and Management are organizing an intercollegiate cultural festival named "Tycoons" which also gives importance to curricular activities such as paper presentations, seminars, quiz, etc.

Alumni
The Rathinam Alumni Association is an international organization with chapters throughout the world, connecting alumni in networking, social events and fundraising.

See also
K.P.M. Trust

References

External links
Official website

Universities and colleges in Coimbatore